Miss Universe Hungary is a national beauty pageant in Hungary for Miss Universe pageant.

History
Miss Universe Hungary was held for the first time in 1992. Since that year the owner of the pageant was Mr. Adam Fasy until in 2006. In 2007 to 2013 the national franchise holder of Miss Universe in Hungary was taken by Magyarorszag Szepe Kft. or called as Beauty of Hungary Ltd. During that years, the winner of A Szépségkirálynő will compete at the Miss Universe pageant. Between 2008 and 2013, the Miss Universe Hungary Organization started to choose three equal winners to represent Hungary at Miss Universe, Miss World, and Miss Earth pageants. Since 2014 a company in under management of Andrew G & Tímea Vajna will held the Miss Universe Hungary in separate pageant. Began 2018 the MUH, new director owned Miss Universe Hungary.

Crown design
In 2014, the official crown was created by the pageant's national director Tímea Vajna. The new crown marks the beginning of a decade long relationship with the Miss Hungary Organization. Vajna also made the crown for the next Miss Universe Hungary.

Titleholders

The Winner of Miss Universe Hungary represents the country at the Miss Universe pageant. If the winner will resign the title, the runner-up will take over the crown.

Statistics

See also

other Hungarian beauty pageants are

 Magyarország Szépe
 Miss International Hungary
 Miss Hungary
 Miss Earth
 Belle of the Anna-ball

Notes
Ildikó Bóna competed at the Miss Intercontinental 2008 and placed as Top 15.
Jázmin Dammak previously crowned as Miss Hungary 1999 and placed as 2nd Princess of Queen of the World 2002 contest.
Ágnes Konkoly previously represented Hungary at the Miss Supranational 2011 and placed as Top 20 Semi-finalist.
Henrietta Kelemen previously crowned as Miss Hungary in 2012.

External links 
 

Beauty pageants in Hungary
Recurring events established in 1992
Hungary
Hungarian awards